Karol Beck and Édouard Roger-Vasselin were the defending champions but decided not to participate.
Philip Bester and Vasek Pospisil won the title, defeating Yuichi Ito and Takuto Niki 6–1, 6–2 in the final.

Seeds

Draw

Draw

References
 Main Draw

Challenger Banque Nationale de Granby
Challenger de Granby